Liam Rory Delap (born 8 February 2003) is an English professional footballer who plays as a forward for EFL Championship club Preston North End, on loan from Premier League club Manchester City.

Club career
Delap joined Manchester City's academy in 2019 from Derby County, impressing from a young age and being capped at several youth levels with England. He scored a goal and set up two others in the final of the 2020 Under-18 Premier League Cup.

On 24 September 2020, Delap made his first-team debut in a 2–1 home win against AFC Bournemouth in the EFL Cup, scoring his first senior goal in the 18th minute. After the match, manager Pep Guardiola praised him and confirmed Delap would continue training with the first team. Three days later, he made his Premier League debut in a 5–2 home defeat by Leicester City, coming on as a substitute for Fernandinho in the 51st minute. In April 2021, Guardiola confirmed that Delap would be moved up to the first-team permanently before the following season. Delap won his first trophy on April 25, when City defeated Tottenham 1–0 in the League Cup final at Wembley Stadium. Delap, however, was not selected for the squad and instead had to follow the match in the stands.

During the 2021 pre-season, Delap suffered an injury to his foot, which led to him missing the Community Shield against Leicester City, which Manchester City lost 1–0, and the Premier League opener against Tottenham Hotspur, which they also lost 1–0. On 20 August, amid interest from several Championship clubs looking to loan him, Delap signed a three-year contract extension, keeping him at the club until 2026. Following a number of injuries, he made his first appearance of the season as a substitute in the FA Cup 3rd Round tie against Fulham in February 2022, and also came on during the 4–0 win over Norwich City in the Premier League, winning the penalty for the 4th goal. On 15 February 2022, Delap made his UEFA Champions League debut in the first leg of the round of 16 tie as a substitute for Bernardo Silva, in a 5–0 away win over Primeira Liga champions Sporting CP.

On 18 August 2022, Delap joined Stoke City on loan for the 2022–23 season. He scored his first goal for Stoke in a 3–1 win over Sheffield United on 8 October 2022. After making 23 appearances for Stoke, scoring three goals, Delap was recalled by Manchester City on 12 January 2023 and was sent to Preston North End for the remainder of the 2022–23 season.

International career
Delap has represented England at youth level. He finished as top scorer at the 2019 Mercedes-Benz Aegean Tournament for U16 international sides in Turkey, and went on to play for the U17s. On 29 March 2021, Delap made his debut for England U18s during a 2–0 win away to Wales at Leckwith Stadium. On 23 March 2022, Delap made his U19 debut as a substitute in a 3–1 win over Republic of Ireland during 2022 UEFA European Under-19 Championship qualification at the Bescot Stadium. On 17 June 2022, Delap was included in the England U19 squad for the 2022 UEFA European Under-19 Championship. He scored the only goal of the match in their last group fixture. On 1 July 2022, Delap came off the bench during extra time in the final and helped Aaron Ramsey score the last goal of the game as England beat Israel 3–1 to win the tournament.

On 21 September 2022, Delap made his England U20 debut and scored during a 3–0 victory over Chile at the Pinatar Arena.

Personal life
Delap was born in Winchester, Hampshire, and is the son of former professional footballer Rory Delap, who represented the Republic of Ireland national team. His grandfather and three great-uncles are originally from Letterkenny, County Donegal.

Career statistics

Honours
England U19s

 UEFA European Under-19 Championship: 2022

References

External links
Profile at the Manchester City F.C. website

2003 births
Living people
Sportspeople from Winchester
Footballers from Hampshire
English footballers
England youth international footballers
Association football forwards
Derby County F.C. players
Manchester City F.C. players
Stoke City F.C. players
Preston North End F.C. players
Premier League players
English people of Irish descent
English Football League players